Porozumienie Polskie ( or Polish Alliance) is a small political group in Polish parliament, with members of the Sejm elected from the League of Polish Families electoral committee.

Founded by Jan Łopuszański in 1999, who himself was elected to the Sejm from the Radom constituency, there have also been others also elected: Mariusz Grabowski (Tarnów), Halina Nowina Konopka (Olsztyn), Witold Tomczak (Kalisz), Stanisław Papież, Stanisław Szyszkowski, Piotr Krutul (Białystok) and Mariusz Olszewski (Kielce) who defected to the grouping mid-term.

References

Conservative parties in Poland
Catholic political parties
Political parties in Poland
Political parties with year of establishment missing
Right-wing parties in Europe
National conservative parties